Sheridan Jobbins (born 2 July 1960) is an Australian journalist, television presenter and screenwriter.

Life and career
Jobbins was born in Melbourne, Australia. She was educated at Ascham School, Edgecliff. She is a third generation Australian film maker, whose family includes: grandfather, Cinesound cinematographer George Malcolm; parents, advertising executives Harry & Joy Jobbins; sister, comedian/writer Saturday Rosenberg; and uncle, sound recordist Ken Malcolm. At the age of 9, she presented a televisions series called Cooking with Sheri on ATN 7. The show ran from 1967 – 1969. She was later credited by Guinness World Records as being the world's youngest television host. A record that stood until 2006.

In the late 1970s, she had a brief career as an actor in Australian soap operas, making a featured appearance in Glenview High, and smaller roles in The Restless Years and The Young Doctors. From 1981 – 1984 Sheridan was a reporter on the multi-award winning children's television programme, Simon Townsend's Wonder World! (screened on Network 10.) Other on screen television credits include being a reporter on State of the Arts (later, Billboard) on the ABC, and Good Morning Australia – Network 10.

In 1994, she hosted a 13 × 1 hour television series, House of Fun, also for Network 10. Jobbins is a member of both the Australian and American Writers Guilds.

She writes full-time with Australian film director/writer, Stephan Elliott. Their most recent credit is the feature film Easy Virtue, starring Colin Firth, Kristin Scott Thomas, Jessica Biel and Ben Barnes. Based on a stage play of the same name by Noël Coward, Easy Virtue premiered at the Toronto Film Festival, and has screened at the Rome and London film festivals to great acclaim.

Jobbins is currently a regular contributor to the Australian Broadcasting Corporation's website Unleashed.

Producer
From 1985 – 86, Jobbins joined friend, Amanda Keller, to produce music videos for Australian bands including; Mental As Anything (Live It Up), Mondo Rock (Modern Bop), and Cold Chisel (Flame Trees). She appears in audience of the Live It Up music video.

She also wrote, produced and directed several short films, two of which Machinations (1987) won a bronze medal at the New York Film & Television Festival, and I Am Time was a finalist in the Dendy Awards, which opened the Sydney Film Festival in 1993

From 1993 until 2000 she was a Director of Rebel Penfold-Russell's company, Latent Image Productions. She was in charge of research and development of the company's on-going production slate. In that time, Latent Image produced the multi award winning feature films, The Adventures of Priscilla, Queen of the Desert, Paws and WillFull.

A short film Jobbins' wrote for Latent Image called, Alex's Party screened at the Palm Springs International Festival of Short Films 2006, and Flickerfest 2007.

Screenwriter
Jobbins currently writes screenplays full-time with writer/director Stephan Elliott. Their current 'in development' writing credits include: Madams, Dante's Disco Inferno, Forever and a Day, Venetian Wedding and In the Name of Dog.

The screenplay; Easy Virtue adapted from a stageplay of the same name by Noël Coward has been produced by Barnaby Thompson for Fragile Films and Ealing Studios under the direction of Stephan Elliott. The film premiered at the Toronto International Film Festival, and has been invited to a variety of international film festivals including the London Film Festival.

Easy Virtue starring Ben Barnes, Jessica Biel, Kristin Scott Thomas and Colin Firth (among others) is due for release in Europe on 7 November 2008.

Jobbins has also contributed to, Breast Wishes, a comedy musical about 'breasts, and the people who support them'. "Breast Wishes" is an official fund raising supporter of the Australian National Breast Cancer Foundation, and will premier at The Sydney Theatre on 31 October 2008 as the closing event of Breast Cancer Awareness Month.

Jobbins also blogs about scriptwriting under the name Script Whisperer, and, as of 2012, is also a cameo contributor to Script Frenzy.

Author
In September 2017, Jobbins published her first book, 'Wish You Were Here', which she describes as a 'rom-com memoir'. In it, she leaves a marriage, buys a Chevy Camaro, and sets out on the American highways. Jobbins works through the stages of grief by running away - and accidentally stumbles into a relationship with a Welsh philosopher. Along the way she encounters American life from LA’s diners to Yosemite bears, Memphis blues, apple pies and Amish hospitality.

"Entertaining, colourful, thought-provoking, and life-affirming, this authentic rom-com road trip will appeal to the broken-hearted and to those looking for stories of travel and love." Books and Publishing

"Raw, hilarious and wise, this wild ride will have you crying with laughter" Amanda Keller

"An absolutely riveting read. Hilarious and moving simultaneously." Mark Colvin

References

External links

WillFull promotional package
TV production information
The Age "Simon Townsend's Wonder World!"
 National Film and Sound Archive, Australia
'Easy Virtue' film trailer
Toronto Premier Easy Virtue
Script Whisperer blog
'Wish You Were Here'

1960 births
Australian child actresses
Australian screenwriters
Australian television presenters
Journalists from Melbourne
Living people
People educated at Ascham School
Australian women television presenters